Floros is a surname. Notable people with the surname include:

Constantin Floros (born 1930), Greek-German musicologist
Jason Floros (born 1990), Australian cricketer
John D. Floros, Greek-American food scientist and academic administrator

Greek-language surnames